Ted Lasso is an American sports comedy-drama television series developed by Jason Sudeikis, Bill Lawrence, Brendan Hunt and Joe Kelly, based on a character Sudeikis first portrayed in a series of promos for NBC Sports' coverage of England's Premier League. The show follows Ted Lasso, an American college football coach who is hired to coach an English soccer team with the secret intention that his inexperience will lead it to failure, but whose folksy, optimistic leadership proves unexpectedly successful.

The first season of ten episodes premiered on Apple TV+ on August 14, 2020, with three episodes followed by weekly installments. A second season of 12 episodes premiered on July 23, 2021. In October 2020, the series was renewed for a third season, which premiered on March 15, 2023.

The series has received critical acclaim, with particular praise for its performances (particularly Sudeikis, Hannah Waddingham, and Brett Goldstein), humor, writing, themes, and uplifting tone. Among other accolades, its first season was nominated for 20 Primetime Emmy Awards, becoming the most nominated first-season comedy in Emmy Award history. Sudeikis, Waddingham and Goldstein won for their performances, and the series won the 2021 Primetime Emmy Award for Outstanding Comedy Series. Sudeikis also won the Golden Globe Award for Best Actor – Television Series Musical or Comedy and the Screen Actors Guild Award for Outstanding Performance by a Male Actor in a Comedy Series.

Premise
Ted Lasso, an American college football coach, is unexpectedly recruited to coach a fictional English Premier League soccer team, AFC Richmond, despite having no experience coaching soccer. The team's owner, Rebecca Welton, hires Lasso hoping he will fail as a means of exacting revenge on the team's previous owner, her unfaithful ex-husband. However, Ted's charm, personality, and humor begin to win over Rebecca, the team, and those who had been skeptical about his appointment.

Cast and characters

Main
 Jason Sudeikis as Ted Lasso, an American college football coach who is hired to coach AFC Richmond, an English soccer team. He is frequently ridiculed for his folksy optimism and inexperience with the sport, but gradually wins people over through his kind, hopeful, and compassionate approach to coaching.
 Hannah Waddingham as Rebecca Welton, the new owner of AFC Richmond. Kind yet vindictive, she initially hires Lasso as a ploy to sabotage the team, but eventually comes to appreciate him.
 Jeremy Swift as Leslie Higgins, the timid but playful Director of Football Operations. He has a large family with five sons.
 Phil Dunster as Jamie Tartt, a talented but egotistical young up-and-coming striker.
 Brett Goldstein as Roy Kent, a veteran box-to-box midfielder, captain and later assistant coach of AFC Richmond. Kent is primarily based on hot-headed Irish former footballer Roy Keane. 
 Brendan Hunt as Coach Beard, Lasso's grounded, laconic longtime assistant and friend.
 Nick Mohammed as Nathan "Nate" Shelley, the team's former kit man turned assistant coach who is now head coach at West Ham United.
 Juno Temple as Keeley Jones, an ambitious model who becomes the club's manager of marketing and public relations, before starting her own firm.
 Sarah Niles as Dr. Sharon Fieldstone (season 2; recurring season 3), a sports psychologist.
 Anthony Head as Rupert Mannion (season 3; recurring season 1; guest season 2), Rebecca's philandering ex-husband, the former owner of AFC Richmond, and the current owner of West Ham United.
 Toheeb Jimoh as Sam Obisanya (season 3; recurring seasons 1–2), a young Nigerian right back, later converted to a right winger.
 Cristo Fernández as Dani Rojas (season 3; recurring seasons 1–2), an enthusiastic young forward from Mexico who joins midway through the first season, after recovering from an injury.
 Kola Bokinni as Isaac McAdoo (season 3; recurring seasons 1–2), a center-back who is the vice-captain, later promoted to captain.
 Billy Harris as Colin Hughes (season 3; recurring seasons 1–2), a young Welsh left winger.
 James Lance as Trent Crimm (season 3; recurring seasons 1–2), a skeptical reporter formerly working for The Independent before being fired in Season 2 after revealing Nate was the anonymous source who leaked Ted’s panic attack.

Recurring

AFC Richmond players
 Stephen Manas as Richard Montlaur, a young French midfielder.
 Moe Jeudy-Lamour as Thierry Zoreaux, a French Canadian goalkeeper and a close friend of Isaac's.
 Charlie Hiscock as Will Kitman (seasons 2–3; guest season 1), the new equipment manager after Nate's promotion.
 David Elsendoorn as Jan Maas (seasons 2–3), a Dutch left back known for his naturally blunt personality.
 Mohammed Hashim as Moe Bumbercatch (seasons 2–3), a center midfielder.
 Maximilian Osinski as Zava (season 3), a talented but attention-seeking footballer.

Other characters
 Annette Badland as Mae, the local pub’s landlady.
 Adam Colborne, Bronson Webb and Kevin Garry as Baz, Jeremy and Paul, a trio of die-hard AFC Richmond fans.
 Keeley Hazell as Bex (season 1; guest season 2), Rupert's new girlfriend and eventual second wife.
 Phoebe Walsh as Jane Payne (season 2; guest season 1), Coach Beard's on-and-off girlfriend.
 Elodie Blomfield as Phoebe (seasons 2–3; guest season 1), Roy's niece.
 Bill Fellows as George Cartrick (season 2; guest season 1), the former Richmond coach whom Ted replaced; later a panelist on Soccer Saturday.
 Ruth Bradley as Mrs. Bowen (season 2), Phoebe's teacher.
 Jodi Balfour as Jack (season 3), a venture capitalist who wants to invest in Keeley's PR firm.
 Becky Ann Baker as Ted's mother (season 3)

Guests
 Andrea Anders as Michelle Lasso, Ted's ex-wife.
 Ellie Taylor as Flo "Sassy" Collins, Rebecca's best friend who becomes attracted to Ted.
 Kieran O'Brien as James Tartt, Jamie's abusive father.
 Jimmy Akingbola as Ollie (season 1), Ted's driver when he arrives in England, who also works at a local Indian restaurant.
 Kiki May as Nora (season 2), Sassy's teenage daughter.
 Harriet Walter as Deborah (season 2), Rebecca's mother.
 Sam Richardson as Edwin Akufo (season 2), a Ghanaian billionaire who buys Raja Casablanca and tries to convince Sam to sign with the team.
 Scott Van Pelt as himself, a SportsCenter anchor who breaks the news regarding Ted's hiring at AFC Richmond.
 Arlo White and Chris Powell as themselves, providing commentary for AFC Richmond's matches.
 Jeff Stelling and Chris Kamara as themselves, as presenter and pundit on Sky Sports Soccer Saturday, the show in which Roy briefly appears.
 Thierry Henry and Gary Lineker as themselves, as soccer pundits throughout the show.
 Seema Jaswal and Ian Wright as themselves, as a soccer TV show presenter and pundit.
 Lloyd Griffith as Lloyd, one of the regular reporters at the AFC Richmond press conferences.
 Fleur East as herself, the host of Lust Conquers All, the reality dating show that Jamie appears on.
 Mike Dean as himself, the referee who officiates AFC Richmond's FA Cup semi-final match against Manchester City.
 Holly Willoughby and Phillip Schofield appear as themselves, presenters of ITV's This Morning who interview Jamie about his appearance on Lust Conquers All.
 Eni Aluko appears as Georgia, a member of the street soccer team in Season 2.
 Peter Crouch, Tom Fordyce and Chris Stark who are members of That Peter Crouch Podcast are heard in a radio show clips describing current events at Richmond.

Episodes

Season 1 (2020)

Season 2 (2021)

Season 3 (2023)

Production

Development 
The series was commissioned in October 2019 by Apple TV+, with Jason Sudeikis reprising his role as Lasso. Sudeikis originally portrayed the title character in 2013 as part of a series of television commercials for NBC Sports promoting their coverage of the Premier League, in which Lasso is depicted as the new head coach of Tottenham Hotspur F.C. Television producer and Scrubs creator Bill Lawrence was brought in to work on a television series based around the character in 2017. The series is co-owned by Warner Bros. Television, where Lawrence's production company Doozer is based, and which controls linear distribution rights to the series, and NBC subsidiary Universal Television, which is a "passive partner".

On August 19, 2020, Apple TV+ renewed the series for a 10-episode second season. It was later confirmed that the second season had been expanded to 12 episodes. On October 28, 2020, the series was renewed for a third season. On an episode of the Scrubs rewatch podcast Fake Doctors, Real Friends with Zach + Donald, Lawrence indicated that Ted Lasso would likely be a "three-season show" due to Sudeikis' limited availability beyond the third season, and that the story had a planned resolution within those three seasons. In June 2022, Brett Goldstein also commented that the series would end after three seasons—"We are writing it like that." In March 2023, Sudeikis said that the third season "is the end of this story that we wanted to tell", and that there are possibilities for spin-offs. 

In October 2021, Apple TV+ reached a licensing deal with the Premier League worth as much as £500,000 (around $682,000) for the series to feature the league's logos, kits, and trophy starting from the third season. On March 6, 2022, a day before filming for season 3 began, Nike, Inc. posted on its official Twitter account a photo of its trademark Swoosh logo incorporated onto an AFC Richmond kit, implying that the show's production had reached a deal with the company to act as the fictional club's "official" kit manufacturer on future episodes.

Some sources have noted the many similarities between the character of Ted Lasso and Terry Smith, an American football head coach who became the first American to be the manager/head coach of a professional English soccer club. AppleMagazine.com (which is not affiliated with Apple Inc.) writes that the series "was actually inspired by the story of Terry Smith, an American gridiron football coach who took over the English association football team Chester City and subsequently installed himself as the first-team coach".

Writing 
Actors in the series Brett Goldstein and Brendan Hunt also joined the writing team along with Sudeikis as the second and third members of the main cast to do so. While Hunt and Sudeikis were part of both the cast and writing team from the start, Goldstein was initially a writer and story editor. It was only after sending a video audition of some already written Roy Kent scenes to the showrunner, Bill Lawrence, that led to Goldstein's casting.

The episodes "Carol of the Bells" and "Beard After Hours" were the two episodes developed when the second season was expanded by two episodes, fitting in to the continuity of the second season without impacting storylines of the already written episodes.

Casting 
Theo Park is the series' casting director. Nick Mohammed, who portrays Nate Shelley, originally auditioned for the role of Leslie Higgins, which in the end went to Jeremy Swift. Park pushed for Phil Dunster to play the role of Jamie Tartt, even though the character was originally supposed to be from Latin America and portrayed by Cristo Fernández. The character of Sam Obisanya was originally going to have been of Ghanaian heritage, but the character was changed after Toheeb Jimoh's casting. In March 2021, Sarah Niles was cast as Dr. Sharon Fieldstone, a sports psychologist for AFC Richmond in a main capacity for the second season. About Niles' casting, Park said that "It was really important with that role that [Niles] had a real sense of security and almost completely unflappable." Kiki May portrays Nora, Sassy's teenaged daughter, in a recurring capacity in the second season. Casting for season three was set to begin near the end of 2021. Jodi Balfour was cast as Jack, a venture capitalist, in a recurring capacity for the third season in April 2022.

Filming 

Production began on the second season in January 2021. In March 2021, Jason Sudeikis and Hannah Waddingham were spotted filming outside a pub in London. Filming wrapped for the second season on June 4, 2021. Filming for the third season is set to take place between January and June 2022. Most of the pub and street scenes have been shot in the actual London Borough of Richmond. AFC Richmond's training field and complex in which Rebecca's office is based is filmed at the SkyEX Community Stadium which is the home ground of Hayes & Yeading United F.C. who are a semi-professional club playing in England's seventh level of competitive soccer, whereas Nelson Road, the home stadium of Richmond, is actually Selhurst Park, a real-life Premier League stadium used by London club Crystal Palace F.C. Exterior shots of Craven Cottage, the home stadium of Fulham F.C. were used in season 1 to pass off as fellow Premier League ground Goodison Park when AFC Richmond played away at Everton. Wembley Stadium was used in season 2 to portray the FA Cup semi-final with Manchester City F.C.

The show incorporates many real-life members of the British soccer and television entertainment community. This also includes using a number of genuine television shows which feature the actual presenters, sets and theme songs, including the Sky Sports programme Soccer Saturday. The day-time ITV show This Morning also features in season 2.

Filming for season 3 began on March 7, 2022. The series filmed on location in Amsterdam for season 3. With the emergence of Nate becoming West Ham United's head coach during season 3, the clubs London Stadium was used for filming.

Merchandising
In March 2021, Bill Lawrence revealed that official Ted Lasso merchandise would be for sale ahead of the season two premiere. The merchandise, including football jerseys, became available in June 2021.

Reception

Critical response

Season 1 
Review aggregator Rotten Tomatoes reported an approval rating of 92% based on 74 reviews, with an average rating of 8.2/10. The website's critics consensus reads, "Warm and winsome, if not particularly hilarious, Ted Lasso fleshes out its promo premise with unrelenting optimism and a charming turn from Jason Sudeikis." Metacritic gave the first season a weighted average score of 71 out of 100 based on 21 reviews, indicating "generally favorable reviews".

Kristen Baldwin of Entertainment Weekly gave the series an A− and wrote, "There's nothing groundbreaking about the way Ted Lasso story beats play out, but the show—a mix of workplace antics, sentimental sports inspo, and soapy romance—is undeniably winning." Reviewing the series for Rolling Stone, Alan Sepinwall described the series as "extremely likable throughout, but it's more a hypothetical comedy than an actual one. There are long stretches where Juno Temple is the only actor even trying to sell what few jokes are in the scripts." and gave a rating of 3/5. Writing for The Guardian, Benjamin Lee gave it 2/5, describing it as "a show that isn't unwatchably bad but isn't really much of anything", and suggesting that some of its humor was "rooted in some questionable and uneasy stereotypes".

As the season went on, critical appreciation for the show increased. After the eighth episode aired, Caroline Framke of Variety published a review with the headline "For Your Reconsideration: Ted Lasso". She went on to say, "Above all odds, Ted Lasso chipped away at my skepticism until there was none left—just like the character himself does to everyone he meets", adding, "At a time when just about everything feels catastrophic, there's something undeniably satisfying about spending some time with good people who are just trying to be the best they can, on and off the field." Keri Lumm of Paste said, after the airing of the penultimate episode, "Ted Lasso is the wholesome American hero we need", going on to say "... the landscape of television has felt kind of gloomy, so imagine my surprise when I turned on the TV to Ted Lasso and felt a swelling of a now unfamiliar emotion—hope." And after the finale aired, Lea Palmieri from Decider said: "Every step of the way, Ted Lasso proves to be comforting and entertaining and somehow both a distraction and a reminder that kindness is out there, not just on this fictional show, not just across the pond, but deep in the heart of America too."

Season 2 
The second season was met with critical acclaim. Rotten Tomatoes reported an approval rating of 98% based on 124 reviews, with an average rating of 8.6/10. The website's critics consensus reads, "As comforting as a buttery biscuit from a friend, Ted Lassos sophomore season is a feel-good triumph that plays into the show's strengths while giving its supporting team more time on the pitch." Metacritic gave the second season a weighted average score of 85 out of 100 based on 35 reviews, indicating "universal acclaim".

Season 3 
On Rotten Tomatoes, the season has an approval rating of 93% based on 71 reviews, with an average rating of 7.6/10. The website's critics consensus reads, "Ted Lassos third and possibly final season takes time to find its footing, but patient viewers who believe will find that they appreciate Coach as much as ever." Metacritic gave the third season a weighted average score of 72 out of 100 based on 28 reviews, indicating "generally favorable reviews".

Awards and nominations

The first season received 20 nominations at the 73rd Primetime Emmy Awards, becoming the most nominated freshman comedy in Emmy Award history. It won 7 awards, including Outstanding Comedy Series and acting awards for Jason Sudeikis, Brett Goldstein and Hannah Waddingham; while Brendan Hunt, Nick Mohammed, Jeremy Swift and Juno Temple received nominations. Sudeikis also won the Golden Globe Award for Best Actor – Television Series Musical or Comedy and the Screen Actors Guild Award for Outstanding Performance by a Male Actor in a Comedy Series for 2020 and 2021.

The series won in the categories for Outstanding New Program, Outstanding Achievement in Comedy and Program of the Year at the 37th TCA Awards and also won for best Comedy Series and New Series at the 73rd Writers Guild of America Awards.

The second season received 20 nominations at the 74th Primetime Emmy Awards. It won four awards, including Outstanding Comedy Series, acting awards for Sudeikis and Goldstein, and a directing award for MJ Delaney. Several actors received nominations, including Toheeb Jimoh, Mohammed, Temple, Waddingham, Sarah Niles, James Lance, Sam Richardson and Harriet Walter.

Following the debut of the third season, the cast of Ted Lasso were invited by US President Joe Biden and First Lady Jill Biden to the White House to promote mental health and well-being, a theme that was brought up in the second and third seasons of the show.

Audience viewership 
Ted Lasso became the most watched television series on Apple TV+. The first season premiere episode became Apple TV+'s most watched premiere and it ranked 89th overall among other television series or shows measured across streaming platforms from November 1, 2019, to July 18, 2021. According to TV analytics provider TVision, Ted Lasso has been viewed by panel members 8.4 times as much as the average Apple TV+ original series or shows TVision has measured since Apple TV+ launched in November 2019. Over the second season premiere weekend, Apple TV+ expanded its number of new viewers by 50% week over week. Apple also announced the second season of Ted Lasso "increased its viewership by six times over season one". In 2021, the final episode of the second season ranked ninth place among all SVOD programs and fifth place in the SVOD originals category with 507 million minutes (MM) viewed.

Other media
In December 2021, Apple TV+ released Ted Lasso: The Missing Christmas Mustache, a four-minute claymation special.

In September 2022, it was announced that AFC Richmond and Nelson Road would appear in the video game FIFA 23. The team would be available in multiple online and offline modes, with players also able to select Ted Lasso to manage any team in the game, as well as have someone else manage the team. Ted Lasso, Coach Beard, Roy Kent, Jamie Tartt, Sam Obisanya, and Dani Rojas are featured in the game.

See also
 The First Team, British sitcom featuring an American player who joins a Premier League club
 Hot Stove League, Korean drama series about a general manager with no experience in baseball hired to lead a struggling baseball team
 Major League, 1989 film featuring misfit baseball players and a meddling new team owner
 Mike Bassett: England Manager, 2001 British mockumentary comedy film about a coach who is hired from the lower leagues to manage the England team at the World Cup.
 Mike Bassett: Manager, 2005 British comedy series, a follow-up to the film which sees an unsuccessful coach on a bad run of form taking over as the new manager of his late father's former team.
 Dream Team, British TV series featuring the on and off the field affairs of fictional Premier League club Harchester United.
 Welcome to Wrexham, 2022 American documentary series chronicling the purchase and stewardship of Wrexham AFC, one of professional football's oldest clubs, by two Hollywood actors, Ryan Reynolds and Rob McElhenney.

References

External links
  – official site
 
 Official screenplay of "Rainbow"

2020 American television series debuts
2020s American comedy-drama television series
Apple TV+ original programming
2020s American single-camera sitcoms
American sports television series
English-language television shows
Fictional association football television series
Primetime Emmy Award for Outstanding Comedy Series winners
Primetime Emmy Award-winning television series
Television series created by Bill Lawrence (TV producer)
Television series by Warner Bros. Television Studios
Television series by Universal Television
Television shows set in England
Television shows shot in London
Works based on advertisements
Outstanding Performance by an Ensemble in a Comedy Series Screen Actors Guild Award winners
Peabody Award-winning television programs